Ahmed Zairi Zammel (born 12 October 1944) is a Tunisian long-distance runner. He competed in the men's 5000 metres at the 1968 Summer Olympics.

References

1944 births
Living people
Athletes (track and field) at the 1968 Summer Olympics
Tunisian male long-distance runners
Olympic athletes of Tunisia
Place of birth missing (living people)
20th-century Tunisian people